Anne Hagopian van Buren (1927– October 13, 2008) was an art historian who studied 14th and 15th century Netherlandish art. She graduated from Radcliffe College. She earned a Ph.D. in art history from Bryn Mawr College and taught at Tufts University from 1976 to 1984. Her husband was the theologian Paul van Buren.

Hagopian's article "Reality and Literary Romance in the Park of Hesdin" explores the literary origins of motifs found in Robert d'Artois's garden at Hesdin. Hagopian wrote that "the imagery from French romances is realized at Hesdin".

Selected publications

van Buren, Anne Hagopian (2011). Illuminating Fashion: Dress in the Art of Medieval France and the Netherlands, 1325-1515. New York : The Morgan Library & Museum.

References

1927 births
2008 deaths
American art historians
Women art historians
Radcliffe College alumni
Bryn Mawr College alumni
Tufts University faculty